Ines Bekrar (born 11 May 2003) is an Algerian junior tennis player.

Career

Junior years
Bekrar has a career-high ITF juniors ranking of 93, achieved on 4 January 2021.

ITF junior finals

Singles (2–2)

Doubles (3–4)

National representation

Fed Cup
Bekrar made her Fed Cup debut for Algeria in 2019, while the team was competing in the Europe/Africa Zone Group III, when she was 15 years and 340 days old.

Fed Cup (12–8)

Singles (7–6)

Doubles (5–2)

References

External links
 
 
 

2003 births
Living people
Algerian female tennis players
21st-century Algerian people